The following is a list of executive orders signed by President Luiz Inácio Lula da Silva.

Many of these decrees are called measures (medidas), provisional measures (medidas provisórias) or revocations (revogaços).

Third presidency (2023-2027)

References 

Luiz Inácio Lula da Silva